Vaughan—King—Aurora was a federal electoral riding in Ontario, Canada, that was represented in the House of Commons of Canada from 1997 to 2004, and was a provincial electoral riding represented in the Legislative Assembly of Ontario from 1999 to 2007.

Federal riding
The federal riding was created in 1996 as Vaughan—Aurora from parts of Markham, Oak Ridges, and York North ridings. It was subsequently renamed "Vaughan—King—Aurora".

It existed only for the 1997 and 2000 elections.

It was abolished in 2004, as ridings in York Region were redistributed due to its fast-growing population. The riding was redistributed into Newmarket—Aurora, Oak Ridges—Markham, and Vaughan ridings.

Provincial riding
The provincial riding of Vaughan—King—Aurora was created before the 1999 election when Ontario provincial electoral districts were redefined to be the same as the federal districts. Municipalities in this riding were previously in parts of York Centre (Vaughan) and York—Mackenzie (Newmarket, Aurora, King) ridings.

The riding was last held by Greg Sorbara, representing the Ontario Liberal Party in the Legislative Assembly of Ontario. Sorbara served as the Minister of Finance for the Cabinet of Ontario from 2003 to 2005, and from 2006 to 2007.

In 2007 the riding was abolished to match the boundaries of the federal ridings. The riding was redistributed into Newmarket—Aurora, Oak Ridges—Markham, and Vaughan ridings.

Members of Parliament

This riding has elected the following Members of Parliament:

Federal election results

|-

|Liberal
|Maurizio Bevilacqua
|align="right"| 33,502

|Progressive Conservative
|Lara Coombs
|align="right"| 8,591

|New Democratic
| Robert Navarretta
|align="right"| 2,250

|Independent
|Andrew James
|align="right"|524

|-

|Liberal
|Maurizio Bevilacqua
|align="right"|38,208

|Progressive Conservative
|Menotti Mazzuca
|align="right"| 6,551

|New Democratic
|Octavia Beckles
|align="right"|1,938

|No affiliation
|Lesley Arden Knight
|align="right"|384

Provincial election results

See also
 List of Canadian federal electoral districts
 Past Canadian electoral districts

References

External links
 Library of Parliament: Vaughan-King-Aurora federal riding information
 Legislative Assembly of Ontario - Greg Sorbara
 Elections Ontario  1999 results and 2003 results
 CBC: Ontario Votes 2003 - Vaughan-King-Aurora Riding Profile

Former federal electoral districts of Ontario
Former provincial electoral districts of Ontario
Aurora, Ontario
Politics of King, Ontario
Politics of Vaughan